Islam in Africa is the continent's second most widely professed faith behind Christianity. Africa was the first continent into which Islam spread from Southwest Asia, during the early 7th century CE. Almost one-third of the world's Muslim population resides in Africa. Muslims crossed current Djibouti and Somalia to seek refuge in present-day Eritrea and Ethiopia during the Hijrah ('Migration') to the Christian Kingdom of Aksum. Like the vast majority (90%) of Muslims in the world, most Muslims in Africa are also Sunni Muslims; the complexity of Islam in Africa is revealed in the various schools of thought, traditions, and voices in many African countries. Many African ethnicities, mostly in North, West and East Africa consider Islam their Traditional religion. The practice of Islam on the continent is not static and is constantly being reshaped by prevalent social, economic, and political conditions. Generally Islam in Africa often adapted to African cultural contexts and belief systems forming Africa's own orthodoxies.

It was estimated in 2002 that Muslims constituted 40% of the population of Africa, a fraction which has slightly decreased in the meantime due to high birth rates in predominantly Christian Sub-Saharan Africa. Islam is the main religion of North Africa, the Horn of Africa, Sahel, the Swahili Coast, and West Africa, with minority immigrant populations in South Africa.

History
 

The presence of Islam in Africa can be traced to the 7th century CE, when in Rajab 8 BH, or May 614 CE, Muhammad advised a number of his early disciples, who were facing persecution by the polytheistic inhabitants of the Mecca, to seek refuge across the Red Sea in Axum. In the Muslim tradition, this event is known as the first hijrah, or migration. Twenty-three Muslims migrated to Abyssinia where they were protected by its king, Armah An-Najāshī, who later accepted Islam. They were followed by 101 Muslims later in the same year. Most of those Muslims returned to Medina in 7 AH / 628 CE but some settled in the neighboring Zeila (current day Somalia ) which was at that time part of Bilād al-Barbar ("Land of the Berber(s)"). Once in Zeila, they built the Masjid al-Qiblaṫayn ("Mosque of the two Qiblahs") in 627 CE. This mosque has two Qiblas because it was built before the Prophet switched the Qiblah from Jerusalem to Mecca. They also reportedly built Africa's oldest mosque, that is the Mosque of the Companions in the Eritrean city of Massawa. This qibla of this mosque in Massawa points towards Jerusalem as well, though now defunct, occasional prayers are still held in this mosque with qibla correction towards Mecca. 

In 20 H / 641 CE, during the reign of Caliph Umar ibn al-Khattab, Muslim troops took over current Egypt and conquered current Libya the following year. Muslims then expanded to current Tunisia in 27 H / 647 CE, during the reign of the third Muslim Caliph Uthman Ibn Affan. The conquest of North Africa continued under the Umayyad dynasty, which annexed parts of Algeria around 61 H/680 CE and Morocco the following year. From the latter Muslim troops crossed the Strait of Gibraltar to Europe in 92 H/711 CE. Islam gained momentum during the 10th century in West Africa with the start of the Almoravid dynasty movement on the Senegal River and as rulers and kings embraced Islam. Islam then spread slowly in much of the continent through trade and preaching. During this period these Muslims from North and West Africa came to be known by Europeans at large as Moors . By the 9th century, Muslim Sultanates started being established in the Horn of Africa, and by the 12th century, the Kilwa Sultanate had spread as far south as Mozambique. Islam only crossed deeper into Malawi and Congo in the second half of the 19th century under the Zanzibar Sultanate. Then the British brought their labor force from India, including some Muslim-Indian nationals, to their colonies in Africa towards the end of the nineteenth and beginning of the twentieth century.

Islam was introduced to the northern Somali coast early on from the Arabian peninsula, shortly after the hijra. Zeila's two-mihrab Masjid al-Qiblatayn dates to the 7th century, and is the oldest mosque in the city. In the late 9th century, Al-Yaqubi wrote that Muslims were living along the northern Somali seaboard. He also mentioned that the Adal kingdom had its capital in the city, suggesting that the Adal Sultanate with Zeila as its headquarters dates back to at least the 9th or 10th century. According to I.M. Lewis, the polity was governed by local dynasties, who also ruled over the similarly-established Sultanate of Mogadishu in the littoral Benadir region to the south. Adal's history from this founding period forth would be characterized by a succession of battles with neighboring Abyssinia.

In the following centuries, the consolidation of Muslim trading networks, connected by lineage, trade, and Sufi brotherhoods, had reached a peak in West Africa, enabling Muslims to wield tremendous political influence and power. During the reign of Umar II, the then governor of Africa, Ismail ibn Abdullah, was said to have won the Berbers to Islam by his just administration. Other early notable missionaries include Abdallah ibn Yasin, who started a movement which caused thousands of Berbers to accept Islam.

The History of Islam in Africa and accounts of how the religion spread, especially in North and the Horn of Africa, has always been contentious. Head of Awqaf Africa London, Sheikh Dr. Abu-Abdullah Adelabu has written in his Movements of Islam in face of the Empires and Kingdoms in Yorubaland claims about the early arrival of Islam in southwestern Nigeria. He seconded the Arab anthropologist Abduhu Badawi on the argument that the early Muslim missionaries had benefited their works from the fall of Kush in northern Sudan and the prosperity of the politically multicultural Abbasid period in the continent which, according to him, had created several streams of migration, moving west in the mid-9th century into Sub-Saharan Africa. Adelabu pointed at the popularity and influences of the Abbasid Dynasty (750–1258), the second great dynasty with the rulers carrying the title of 'Caliph' as fostering peaceful and prosperous migration of the intercultural Muslims from the Nile Valley to Niger as well as of the Arab traders from the desert to Benue. Adelabu's claim seems to be in line with the conventional historical view that the conquest of North Africa by the Umayyad Caliphate between AD 647–709 effectively ended Christianity in Africa for several centuries. Some argue that adoption of Islam was motivated by the desire to enhance trade, as Islam provided a moral code of conduct to regulate commercial activities, especially with respect to credit and security.

Similarly, in the Swahili coast, Islam made its way inland – spreading at the expense of traditional African religions. This expansion of Islam in Africa not only led to the formation of new communities in Africa, but it also reconfigured existing African communities and empires to be based on Islamic models. Indeed, in the middle of the 11th century, the Kanem Empire, whose influence extended into Sudan, converted to Islam. At the same time but more toward West Africa, the reigning ruler of the Bornu Empire embraced Islam. As these kingdoms adopted Islam, their subjects thereafter followed suit. In praising the Africans' zealousness to Islam, the 14th-century explorer Ibn Battuta stated that mosques were so crowded on Fridays, that unless one went very early, it was impossible to find a place to sit.

In the 16th century, the Ouaddai Empire and the Kingdom of Kano embraced Islam, and later toward the 18th century, the Nigeria based Sokoto Caliphate led by Usman dan Fodio exerted considerable effort in spreading Islam.

Today, Islam is the predominant religion of the northern half of Africa, mainly concentrated in North Africa, the Horn of Africa and the Sahel, as well as West Africa.

Characteristics

Islam has been in Africa for so long, since its emergence on the Arabian peninsula, that some scholars have argued that it is a traditional African religion.

Although the majority of Muslims in Africa are non-denominational Muslims, Sunni or Sufi, the complexity of Islam in Africa is revealed in the various schools of thought, traditions, and voices that constantly contend for dominance in many African countries. Islam in Africa is not static and is constantly being reshaped by prevalent social, economic and political conditions.

Islam in Africa is often adapted to local cultural contexts and belief systems, thereby forming the continent's own orthodoxies. Different societies in Africa have generally appropriated Islam in both more inclusive ways, or in the more radical ways, as with the Almoravid movement in the Maghreb and Sahara.

Additionally, Islam in Africa has both local and global dimensions. On the local level, experts assert that Muslims (including African Muslims) operate with considerable autonomy and do not have an international organization that regulates their religious practices. This fact accounts for the differences and varieties in Islamic practices throughout the African continent. On the global level, Muslims in Africa are also part of the Ummah (Islamic community worldwide), and follow global issues and current events that affect the Muslim world with keen interest. With globalization and new initiatives in information technology, Muslims in Africa have developed and maintained close connections with the wider Muslim world.

Analysts argue that Muslims in Africa, like other Muslims in Asia, the Middle East and the rest of the world, seem to be locked into an intense struggle regarding the future direction of Islam. At core of the struggle are questions about the way in which Muslims should practice their faith. The scholars assert that the majority seems to prefer to remain on the moderate, tolerant course that Islam has historically followed. However, a relatively small, but growing group would like to establish a stricter form of the religion, one that informs and controls all aspects of society.

Shari'ah

The Sharīʿah of Islam broadly influences the legal code in most Islamic countries, but the extent of which its impact varies widely. In Africa, most states limit the use of Sharia to "personal-status law" for issues such as marriage, divorce, inheritance and child custody. With the exception of northern Nigeria in West Africa, secularism does not seem to face any serious threat in Africa, even though the new Islamic revival is having a great impact upon segments of Muslim populations. Cohabitation or coexistence between Muslims and non-Muslims remains, for the most part, peaceful.

Nigeria is home to Africa's largest Muslim population. In 1999, Nigeria's northern states adopted the Sharia penal code, but punishments have been rare. In fact, dozens of women convicted of adultery and sentenced to stoning to death have later been freed. Egypt, one of the largest Muslim states in Africa, claims Sharia as the main source of its legislation, yet its penal and civil codes are based largely on French law. Although recent research has found that in establishing the French penal and civic codes, Napoleon actually based them largely upon Maliki Fiqh rulings he was exposed to while in Egypt.

Sects

Muslims in Africa mostly adhere to the Sunni Islam, with sizable Ibadi adherents. In addition, Sufism, the mystical dimension of Islam, has a very big presence. The Maliki madh'hab is the dominant school of jurisprudence amongst most of the continent's Sunni communities, while the Shafi'i madh'hab is prevalent in the Horn of Africa, eastern Egypt, and the Swahili Coast. The Hanafi fiqh is also followed in western Egypt.

Quranists
Quranism is an umbrella term denoting a strand within Islam that endorses a Quran-oriented form of Islam and often eschews hadiths. There are many forms of Quranism and they may not all agree on practical tenets.

Nondenominational Muslims
According to a survey by Pew, there are thirteen countries in Africa wherein at least twenty percent of the Muslim population adheres to a non-denominational form of Islam, i.e. are non-denominational Muslims. These countries, as well as the percentages of the Muslim populations who fall under this bracket include, Mali (55%), Nigeria (42%), Cameroon (40%), Tunisia (40%), Guinea Bissau (36%), Uganda (33%), Morocco (30%), Senegal (27%), Chad (23%), Ethiopia (23%), Liberia (22%), Niger (20%), and Tanzania (20%).

Sufism

Sufism, which focuses on the mystical elements of Islam, has many orders as well as followers in West Africa and Sudan, and, like other orders, strives to know God through meditation and emotion. Sufis may be nondenominational Muslim, Sunni or Shi’ite, and their ceremonies may involve chanting, music, dancing, and meditation.

Many Sufis in Africa are syncretic where they practise Sufism with traditional folklore beliefs. Salafis criticize the folklorists Sufis, who they claim have incorporated "un-Islamic" beliefs into their practices, such as celebrating the several events, visiting the shrines of "Islamic saints", dancing during prayer (the whirling dervishes).

West Africa and Sudan have various Sufi orders regarded skeptically by the more doctrinally strict branches of Islam in the Middle East. Most orders in West Africa emphasize the role of a spiritual guide, marabout or possessing supernatural power, regarded as an Africanization of Islam. In Senegal and Gambia, Mouridism Sufis claim to have several million adherents and have drawn criticism for their veneration of Mouridism's founder Amadou Bamba. The Tijani is the most popular Sufi order in West Africa, with a large following in Mauritania, Mali, Niger, Senegal and Gambia.

Salafism
Recently, Salafism has begun spreading in Africa, as a result of many Muslim Non-Governmental Organizations (NGOs) such as the World Muslim League, the World Assembly for Muslim Youth, and the Federation of Mab and Islamic Schools primarily funded by Salafi governments in the Arab states of the Persian Gulf. These Salafist organizations, often based out of Saudi Arabia, promote a form of conservative reformism and regard Sufism as "heterodox" and contrary to their interpretation of traditional Islam. Such NGOs have built Salafi-dominated mosques and Islamic centers in Africa, and many are staffed by puritanical African Muslims, often trained in the Middle East. Academic scholarships to study in Islamic universities in the Middle East are also offered to further Salafism.

On the other hand, Africanist scholars trace the popularity of Salafi ideals to local cultural factors and the social efforts of prominent African Salafi scholars, reformists, organisations and intellectuals and their religious ties with various Islamic scholars across the Muslim World.

Notable kingdoms and sultanates

 Harla Kingdom (500 - 1500)
 Wadai Sultanate (1501-1911) 
 Kanem Empire (700 - 1376)
 Idrisid dynasty (789 - 974)
 Sultanate of Mogadishu ( 900 - 16th century)
 Maghrawa dynasty (987 - 1070)
 Kingdom of Kano (1000 - 1805)
 Almoravid dynasty (1073 – 1147)
 Kilwa Sultanate (12th century – 1505)
 Almohad dynasty (1147 – 1269)
 Mali Empire (1230s – 1600s)
 Marinid dynasty (1258 – 1420)
 Ajuran Sultanate (13th century - 17th century)
 Ifat Sultanate (1285 - 1415)
 Songhai Empire (1340 - 1591)
 Bornu Empire (1369 - 1893)
 Adal Sultanate (1415 - 1555)
 Isaaq Sultanate (17th century - 1884)
Wattasid dynasty (1420 – 1554)
 Sennar Sultanate (1502 - 1821)
 Saadi dynasty (1554 – 1659)
 Dendi Kingdom (1591 - 1901)
 Sultanate of Darfur (1603 - 1874)
 Alaouite dynasty (1666 - current)
 Kong Empire (1710 - 1894)
 Majeerteen Sultanate (mid-18th century – early 20th century)
 Imamate of Futa Jallon (1727 - 1896)
 Almamyate of Futa Toro (1776 - 1861)
 Sokoto Caliphate (1804 - 1903)
 Kingdom of Gomma (early 19th century – 1886)
 Kingdom of Jimma (1830 – 1932)
 Kingdom of Gumma (1840 – 1902)
 Wassoulou Empire (1878 - 1898)
 Sultanate of Hobyo (1880s - 1920s)
 Dervish State (1896 - 1920)
 Emirate of Harar (967-1887)
 Makhzumi dynasty (896-1286)

Muslim population in Africa by country 

According to the Pew Research Center, three of the ten countries with the largest Muslim populations in 2015 were in Africa: Nigeria (where there were an estimated 90.02 million Muslims, accounting for 50% of the total population), Egypt (83.87 million; 95.1%) and Algeria (37.21 million; 97.9%).

See also
 List of mosques in Africa
 Trade & Pilgrimage Routes of Ghana
 Islam in South Asia

References

Further reading
 J. Spencer Trimingham, History of Islam in West Africa. Oxford University Press, 1962.
 Nehemia Levtzion and Randall L. Pouwels (eds). The History of Islam in Africa. Ohio University Press, 2000.
 David Robinson. Muslim Societies in African History. Cambridge University Press, 2004.
 Bruce S. Hall, A History of Race in Muslim West Africa, 1600-1960. Cambridge University Press, 2011, .
  . Updated online version
 Chopra, R.M., "SUFISM" (Origin,Growth,Eclipse,Resurgence), 2016, Anuradha Prakashan, New Delhi. .

External links
Online bibliography Islam in Africa (AfricaBib, African Studies Centre, Leiden)
The Story of Africa: Islam, from the BBC World Service.